{{DISPLAYTITLE:S-Adenosyl-L-homocysteine}}

S-Adenosyl-L-homocysteine (SAH) is the biosynthetic precursor to homocysteine.  SAH is formed by the demethylation of S-adenosyl-L-methionine.   Adenosylhomocysteinase converts SAH into homocysteine and adenosine.

Biological role 
DNA methyltransferases are inhibited by SAH. Two S-adenosyl-L-homocysteine cofactor products can bind the active site of DNA methyltransferase 3B and prevent the DNA duplex from binding to the active site, which inhibits DNA methylation.

References

External links 
BioCYC E.Coli K-12 Compound: S-adenosyl-L-homocysteine

Nucleosides
Purines
Amino acid derivatives